Jääger is an Estonian surname meaning "game warden", derived from the German Jäger, meaning "hunter". People bearing the surname include:

Enar Jääger (born 1984), Estonian footballer
Enver Jääger (born 1982),  Estonian footballer
Merle Jääger (born 1965), Estonian poet and actress 

Estonian-language surnames